Asthall barrow is a high-status Anglo-Saxon burial mound from the seventh century AD. It is located in Asthall, Oxfordshire, and was excavated in 1923 and 1924.

Location 
Asthall barrow is located along the strip of the A40 connecting the towns of Witney and Burford; it is immediately north of the A40 where it connects to Burford road, and just south of the byroad leading off Burford to Asthall and Swinbrook. The barrow is prominently located. It sits by Akeman Street where the Roman road crossed the River Windrush, the site of a onetime Roman settlement. It has expansive views, and overlooks the Thames Valley from Lechlade to Wytham Hill. To the north it looks out at Leafield barrow; to the south appears Faringdon Hill and beyond it the Berkshire Downs at White Horse Hill, while to the southeast Sinodun Hill near Dorchester appears, with the Chilterns in the distance. The barrow gives its name to surrounding structures, such as Barrow Plaintation, Barrow Farmhouse, and Asthall Barrow Roundabout.

Architecture 

Once covered in trees including beeches and firs, likely planted in the nineteenth century, the barrow is now topped by a single, prominent, sycamore; the remaining growth was removed during conservation work in 2017 or 2018. The presence of Romano–British grey wares in the barrow's soil, like the downward sloping surrounding land, suggests that the barrow may have been constructed by scraping up the surrounding topsoil. The land around the barrow is cultivated up to its edges, and in 1992 was planted with barley crops.

Originally the barrow probably stood larger; in 1923 an elliptical section surrounding the southwest circumference was recorded as approximately  higher than the field, suggesting that it was once a part of the barrow. That the barrow's finds were not in the centre of its present dimensions also suggests that its original dimensions were somewhat different. Slippage of the barrow's soil may also help explain the changed dimensions, and the recorded reduction in height over time.

Excavation 

The barrow was excavated in August 1923, and again in 1924, by George Bowles, the brother in law of the second Baron Redesdale, who owned the land. Permission to excavate had been unsuccessfully sought in 1872, on behalf of George Rolleston. The 1923 excavation was overseen by Bowles, although actually carried out by a Tom Arnold and five helpers. Bowles was also aided by Edward Thurlow Leeds, then assistant keeper at the University of Oxford's Ashmolean Museum; Leeds offered suggestions, visited the site, and published the main discoveries. He published the 1923 excavation along with an excavation plot by Bowls in The Antiquaries Journal in April 1924, and briefly discussed the 1924 excavation 15 years later in a chapter of A History of Oxfordshire. Both excavations are also plotted, probably by Leeds, on a piece of blue linen held by the Ashmolean.

Bowles dug an irregular, seven-cornered polygonal trench in 1923, and in 1924 added a rectangular trench to its side, along with four 18-inch-square trenches in the area of the raised surrounding soil. He began by sinking a shaft 12 feet square and 12 feet deep; to this he added several subsequent extensions, each to the level of the field or below. He labeled the corners A–H on his plot, omitting the F. Bowles determined the barrow to be undisturbed and to consist of earth mixed with stones, along with the occasional sherd of Romano–British pottery. The surface level was coated in yellowish clay, perhaps brought up from the River Windrush nearby. This faded away toward corner B, Bowles noted, but was prevalent around corner G, the southern limit of the excavation. Atop the clay Bowles found an abundance of charcoal and ashes, six inches thick in places (such as at point V on his plot), and forming only a thin covering elsewhere. Bowles also recorded a large charred timber, between points G and H.

Grave goods 
The barrow contained a large assemblage of items, of a quality indicating the high-status nature of the burial. There were at least seven vessels: three pottery, two hand-made jars, a Merovingian bottle, and a small silver bowl or cup. Fragments of foil, five of which were stamped with zoomorphic interlace patterns, suggest the burial of a decorated drinking horn, and a pear-shaped mount was both patterned and gilded. Other items appear to have been made of bone, and were likely pieces from a gaming set. The finds were donated to the Ashmolean, where they were given the accession numbers 1923.769–782, and 1949.297.

Conservation 
The Asthall barrow was designated a scheduled monument on 16 May 1934. Historic England, which maintains the list of such monuments, noted that the barrow "is one of the best preserved examples of a type of burial mound of which there are about ten examples in West Oxfordshire", and that "[d]espite partial excavation and recent animal burrowing it will contain archaeological and environmental evidence relating to its construction and the landscape in which it was built." Historic England added that the "survival of part of its original drystone retaining wall is an unusual feature", but that regardless, "[a]s a rare monument class all positively identified examples are considered worthy of preservation."

In 2009, the barrow was added to Historic England's "Heritage At Risk Register", a project intended to identify and protect historic sites threatened by neglect, decay, or development. The 2009 list was the first to include scheduled monuments that are archaeological sites; previous iterations had included only listed buildings, structural scheduled monuments, registered battlefields, and protected wreck sites. The barrow remained on the at-risk register through 2017. From 2009 to 2014, the its condition was described as "declining" with "generally unsatisfactory with major localised problems," and its principal vulnerability was given as scrub and tree growth. Its principal vulnerability was changed to collapse by 2015, although by 2016 its condition was upgraded to "improving." In 2017, the barrow's final year on the register, its principal vulnerability was given as extensive rabbit burrowing. The barrow was listed as "saved" and removed from the register the following year, following removal of trees and scrub, and work to exclude rabbits; the large sycamore tree atop the barrow was left in place. The work was done in partnership with the owners, and voluntary wardens from the Cotswolds Area of Outstanding Natural Beauty.

Notes

References

Bibliography 
  
  
  
  
  
  
  
  
  
  
  
  
  
  
  
 
  
 
  
  
  
  
  
  
  
  
  
  
  
  
  
  
 
  

Anglo-Saxon art
Anglo-Saxon burial practices
Anglo-Saxon sites in England
Archaeological sites in Oxfordshire
Scheduled monuments in Oxfordshire
Germanic archaeological artifacts
Germanic archaeological sites
History of Oxfordshire
Drinking horns